Telepizza is a Spanish multinational pizza restaurant chain. As of 2017 it is the largest pizza chain not originating in North America by number of stores.

Telepizza was founded as "Pizza Phone" in 1987 by Leopoldo Fernández Pujals, a Cuban-born American businessman, in Madrid's El Pilar neighbourhood. By 1995 it had 200 locations in Spain with a 52% market share.

The company had factories in the Spanish cities of Guadalajara, Barcelona, Móstoles, and Alcobendas, but those were later sold and all production was moved to a factory in Daganzo de Arriba, Madrid. The pizza base is distributed from the factories to the different stores.

As of 2010, Telepizza has 1025 outlets worldwide; thereof 603 stores in Spain and 422 in markets such as Portugal, the United Kingdom, Peru, Chile, Poland, Russia, Central America, the United Arab Emirates, Saudi Arabia, and Iran. 

In 2010, Telepizza bought the Colombian chain Jeno's Pizza.

In April 2016, Telepizza completed an IPO reported to be valued at euro 550 million. Prior to its IPO, the company was owned by the founding Ballvé family and private equity fund Permira.

In 2017, it opened its first establishment in the United Kingdom. In July 2017, the company opened its first store in Iran and with projections to open two more in December of the same year, it was the first store opened in South Asia and the second in the Middle East. Since November 2017, Telepizza opened its two stores in Paraguay.

References

External links 

 Telepizza official site in Spain.
 Telepizza official site in Chile.
 Telepizza official site in Poland.
 Telepizza official site in Portugal.
 Telepizza official site in Uk.
 Telepizza official site in Iran.

Pizza chains
Permira companies
Restaurants in Spain
Restaurants established in 1987
1987 establishments in Spain
2010 mergers and acquisitions
2016 initial public offerings
Food and drink companies based in Madrid
Fast-food chains of Spain
Companies of Spain
Publicly traded companies
Franchises
San Sebastián de los Reyes
Multinational food companies